Season 2005–06 saw Livingston compete in the Scottish Premier League. They also competed in the League Cup and the Scottish Cup.

Summary
Livingston finished last in the SPL and were relegated to the Scottish First Division. They managed only four wins in 38 games a current joint record they hold with Dunfermline for the fewest wins in a season since the SPL began.

Managers
Under new manager Paul Lambert Livingston only managed two wins in 26 games. This led to him resigning on 11 February 2006 after their defeat to nearest rival Dunfermline. John Robertson was appointed as manager but was unable to stop Livingston's demise managing only a further two wins.

Results & fixtures

SPL

League Cup

Scottish Cup

Statistics

League table

References

Livingston
Livingston F.C. seasons